Alexandra Gripenberg, also known as Alexandra van Grippenberg, (1857 – 24 December 1913) was a Finnish social activist, author, editor, newspaper publisher, and elected politician, and was a leading voice within the movement for women's rights in Finland at the turn of the 20th century. She was also known as a Fennoman.

Biography
Gripenberg was born in 1857, and her family were Swedish-speaking nobles. She was instrumental in the establishment of the first official women's rights organization in Finland, the Suomen Naisyhdistys (Finnish Women's Association), in Helsinki in 1884 and became one of its active members. She served as the president of the association for two terms, 1889–1904 and 1909–1913. Between 1887–1888, she traveled in England and the United States, to study lessons from the women's movements of those countries. The tour inspired her book A Half Year in the New World  published in 1889. The same year she also founded one of the earliest Finnish women's magazines, Koti ja Yhteiskunta, which was published until December 1911. Gripenberg was also the editor-in-chief of the magazine which acted as the organ of the Suomen Naisyhdistys. She served as the treasurer of the International Council of Women from 1893–1899.

Finland granted women's suffrage in 1906. Gripenberg was one of the nineteen women elected in 1907, making her one of the first women to get elected into the Parliament of Finland. She was elected through the conservative Finnish Party, which proved somewhat difficult for her at times as she was Swedish-speaking and the party was Finnish-speaking with strong grass roots support in the Finnish countryside. Gripenberg remained a member of the party until 1909. She died in 1913.

References

Bibliography
 Anna Moring (ed.). (2006). Politics of Gender: A Century of Women's Suffrage in Finland. Helsinki: Otava.
 Aura Korppi-Tommola. (1990). "Fighting Together for Freedom:Nationalism, Socialism, Feminism, and Women's Suffrage in Finland 1906." Journal of Scandinavian History 15: 181-91.
 Helen Rappaport. (2001). "Alexandra van Gripenberg." In Encyclopedia of Women Social Reformers, edited by Helen Rappaport. Santa Barbara: ABC-CLIO, 723-724.
 Riita Jallinoja. (1980). "The Women's Liberation Movement in Finland," Journal of Scandinavian History 5: 36-49.

External links

 
 
 

20th-century Finnish women politicians
1857 births
1913 deaths
Finnish magazine founders
People from Lakhdenpokhsky District
People from Viipuri Province (Grand Duchy of Finland)
Swedish-speaking Finns
19th-century Finnish nobility
Finnish Party politicians
Members of the Parliament of Finland (1907–08)
Members of the Parliament of Finland (1908–09)
Finnish women's rights activists
Finnish suffragists
20th-century Finnish women writers
Finnish feminists
20th-century Swedish women writers
Women members of the Parliament of Finland
20th-century Finnish nobility